Lorenzo Lopez (born November 1, 2001), is an American soccer player who plays as a defender for Portland Timbers 2 via the Portland Timbers academy.

Club career
After playing with the Portland Timbers academy, Lopez appeared for Portland's USL Championship side Portland Timbers 2 on October 15, 2019 as a 76th-minute substitute during a 4-1 loss to El Paso Locomotive.

References

External links
 

2001 births
Living people
Association football defenders
American soccer players
Portland Timbers 2 players
Soccer players from Oregon
USL Championship players
Sportspeople from Oregon City, Oregon
Oregon State Beavers men's soccer players